Roger Hoggett (10 May 1942 – 26 July 2019) was an Australian rules footballer who played with Carlton in the Victorian Football League (VFL). After his VFL career, Roger played with the Western Suburbs Magpies AFC and finished third in the 1966 Phelan medal.  He toured Ireland with the Australian Galahs in 1968.

Notes

External links 

Roger Hoggett's profile at Blueseum

1942 births
2019 deaths
Carlton Football Club players
Longford Football Club players
Western Suburbs Magpies AFC players
Australian rules footballers from Tasmania